The M. A. Benton House is an historic landmark in Fort Worth, Texas (USA), located on a four-lot corner at 1730 Sixth Avenue. This Victorian-style house, still owned by Benton descendants, was built in 1898 and is one of the oldest homes in Fort Worth. The descendants have preserved the cottage's architecture features, including the one-and-a-half-story structure and the fence that has surrounded the cottage since it was first built. As a family home, it is not open to the public. The Benton House is individually listed on the National Register of Historic Places for its architectural qualities. In 1971, the Benton House was designated a Recorded Texas Historic Landmark.

History
The Benton House was owned by a tobacco seller, Meredith A. Benton, and his wife, Ella Belle. M. A. Benton's father, a Kansas City builder, erected the house for the couple in 1898. It was built originally with a barn and hayloft and a two-room servants’ house, but the servants’ quarters were redesigned into a garage building in 1937. Ella Belle Benton lived alone for most of the time because her husband was an active civic worker. She helped start the Rose Gardens, now part of the Fort Worth Botanic Garden, as well as a public kindergarten program.

Features
The Benton House is a Victorian gingerbread home. Made of cypress, it contains six rooms, a central hall, and tiled fireplaces. Some special features of this house are an asymmetrical floorplan, fine spindle work, cross gables over a hipped roof, and a cutaway window.

It is marked by a Texas Historical Marker.

It is subject of a painting by "Texas's Grandma Moses", Sweetie Ladd.

See also

National Register of Historic Places listings in Tarrant County, Texas
Recorded Texas Historic Landmarks in Tarrant County

References

Roark, Carol E. Fort Worth's Legendary Landmarks. Illus. Byrd Williams. Fort Worth: Texas Christian UP, 1995. Print.

External links

Houses on the National Register of Historic Places in Texas
National Register of Historic Places in Fort Worth, Texas
Houses completed in 1898
Houses in Fort Worth, Texas
Recorded Texas Historic Landmarks